Paguekwash Point is a -elevation summit located in western Grand Canyon, in Mohave County of northern Arizona, United States. It is located on the North Rim, about 4.5 miles northwest of Mount Sinyella and across the Colorado River. An excursion of the west-flowing Colorado is ~1.0 mile east, and also ~1.5 miles west. Kanab Point lies about 2.0 miles northwest. Paguekwash Point is in an arid section of the Grand Canyon, with the landform virtually devoid of vegetation.

References

External links

 Aerial view, Paguekwash Point
 

Cliffs of Arizona
Grand Canyon 
Grand Canyon, North Rim
Grand Canyon, North Rim (west)
Grand Canyon National Park
Landforms of Coconino County, Arizona